Jules Peter "Skip" Harlicka (born October 14, 1946) is an American former basketball player for the Atlanta Hawks of the National Basketball Association (NBA).

Harlicka attended the University of South Carolina on a basketball scholarship, but also played baseball his freshman year. During his college basketball career, he averaged 17.5 points per game on 47.5% shooting from the field. Harlicka was drafted with the 13th pick in the 1968 NBA Draft by the Atlanta Hawks. He played one season for the Hawks, appearing in 26 games while averaging 4.1 points per game and 1.4 assists per game.

References

1946 births
Living people
American men's basketball players
Atlanta Hawks draft picks
Atlanta Hawks players
Basketball players from Trenton, New Jersey
Notre Dame High School (New Jersey) alumni
Point guards
South Carolina Gamecocks men's basketball players